Crystal World or The Crystal World may refer to:

Music 
 Crystal World, 2013 album by Marnie
 The Crystal World (album), 2010 album by Locrian
 Mundo de Cristal (Crystal World), 1991 album by Thalía

Literature 
 The Crystal World, 1966 novel by J. G. Ballard
 "Crystal World" (short story), 1991 short story by Victor Pelevin

Other 
 Swarovski Kristallwelten (Crystal Worlds), tourist attraction in Austria

See also 
 World crystal, theoretical model in cosmology
 Crystal Globe (disambiguation), trophy given to the winners of various international competitions